Group A of the 2004 Fed Cup Asia/Oceania Zone Group I was one of two pools in the Asia/Oceania Zone Group I of the 2004 Fed Cup. Four teams competed in a round robin competition, with the top two teams and the bottom two teams proceeding to their respective sections of the play-offs: the top teams play for advancement to the World Group Play-offs, while the bottom teams face potential relegation to Group II.

China vs. Thailand

New Zealand vs. Philippines

China vs. New Zealand

Thailand vs. Philippines

China vs. Philippines

Thailand vs. New Zealand

See also
Fed Cup structure

References

External links
 Fed Cup website

2004 Fed Cup Asia/Oceania Zone